Rostanga bassia is a species of sea slug, a dorid nudibranch, a marine gastropod mollusc in the family Discodorididae.

Distribution
This species was described from Flinders, Westernport Bay, Victoria, Australia.

Description
This dorid nudibranch is bright orange to reddish-orange in colour, and the dorsum is covered with caryophyllidia. This species is very similar to other species of Rostanga.

Ecology
This nudibranch is found on a colony of the red sponge, Clathria cactiformis (family Microcionidae) on which it presumably feeds. Most other species of Rostanga'' also feed on sponges of the family Microcionidae.

References

Discodorididae
Gastropods described in 1989